Gaikhangam Gangmei (born 12 November 1950) is an Indian politician and member of Congress Working Committee. He served as first Deputy Chief Minister of Manipur   from 2012-2017 and also as MPCC president.

Personal life
Gangmei was born in Gaidimjang, Khoupum valley in the Rongmei Naga family of Khangsillung and Lansillung. The youngest of eight siblings, Gangmei at the age of 12 adopted Christianity along with his mother.

History
 Elected MLA from 54-Nungba (ST) A/C, 3rd Manipur Legislative Assembly 1980
 Minister of State -- (Edn., Sw, Arts & Cult. & Sports) 1983-1984
 Elected MLA from 54-Nungba ST-A/C, 4th Manipur Legislative Assembly 1984
 Minister of State (Tribal Dev. & District Council) Manipur (Indep. Charge) 1985- 1988
 Minister of State, I.F.C.D., Manipur 1988-1990
 Elected MLA from 54-Nungba (ST) A/C 5th Manipur Legislative Assembly 1990
 Cabinet Minister, (Forest), Manipur 1992-1993
 Cabinet Minister, (Agri., Hort. & Soil Cons.) 1994
 Elected MLA from 54-Nungba (S/T) A/C the 4th term 2002
 Cabinet Minister, (Works), Manipur 2002-July 2004
 Cabinet Minister, (Power, HSC, IPR), Manipur 7-2000-Apr. 2006
 Elected President of MPCC 10 September 2005
 Deputy Chief Minister, Manipur (2012–17)

References

1950 births
Living people
Manipur politicians
Deputy Chief Ministers of Manipur
State cabinet ministers of Manipur
Manipur MLAs 2017–2022
Naga people
People from Tamenglong district
Indian National Congress politicians from Manipur
Manipur MLAs 1980–1984
Manipur MLAs 1985–1990
Manipur MLAs 1990–1995
Manipur MLAs 2002–2007
Manipur MLAs 2012–2017